The Leaotul is a right tributary of the river Teleajen in Romania. It flows into the Teleajen near Palanca.

References

Rivers of Romania
Rivers of Prahova County